The 1950 season was the Hawthorn Football Club's 26th season in the Victorian Football League and 49th overall.

Fixture

Premiership Season

Ladder

References

Hawthorn Football Club seasons